Bertrada (born c. 670; died after 721), also called Berthe or Bertree, is known to be the mother of Charibert of Laon, with whom she is co-founder and benefactor of the Prüm Abbey. They founded the abbey in 721.

History
Bertrada came from a wealthy Austrasian noble family. Several alternative solutions to the question of her parentage have been suggested, among them:

 She was daughter of the seneschal and Pfalzgraf Hugobert and Irmina of Oeren
 She was the daughter-in-law of Irmina (died c. 704), daughter of Hugobert and Irmina, and her husband Charveus, Count of Laon, brother of Lambert, Count of Hesbaye 
 She was daughter of Theuderic III, king of Neustria and Austrasia, and Clotilda of Herstal.
The last two possibilities are not mutually exclusive.

Bertrada the Elder was married, but the identity of her husband is unknown. Bertrada and her husband had three children:
 Hardrad (d. after 720)
 Charibert of Laon
 Weta, married Cario.

Through Charibert's daughter Bertrada of Laon, wife of Pippin the Short, Bertrada of Prüm is the great-grandmother of Charlemagne.

References

Sources
 Maurice Chaume, "Études carolingiennes I: La famille de saint Guillaume de Gellone", in _Annales de Bourgogne_, vol. I (1929), 27-56 who presents the hypothesis that she was daughter of Theuderic (Thierry).
 Settipani, Christian. "The Ancestors of Charlemagne: Addendum to Addena, 31 January 2000" (PDF).

670 births
Year of birth uncertain
Year of death uncertain
Merovingian dynasty
8th-century Frankish women
8th-century Frankish nobility